Inga cynometrifolia is a species of plant in the family Fabaceae. It is found only in Peru.

References

cynometrifolia
Flora of Peru
Vulnerable plants
Taxonomy articles created by Polbot